is a centaur and damocloid on a cometary-like and retrograde orbit from the outer Solar System, suggesting that it is an extinct comet. It was first observed on 1 June 2013 by astronomers with the Pan-STARRS survey at Haleakala Observatory, Hawaii, in the United States. It holds the record for having the highest orbital inclination of any known minor planet.

Orbit and classification 

 orbits the Sun at a distance of 3.0–12.0 AU once every 20 years and 7 months (7,519 days; semi-major axis of 7.51 AU). Its orbit has an eccentricity of 0.59 and an inclination of 175° with respect to the ecliptic.

It has the highest orbital inclination of any known minor planet which gives it a retrograde orbit. The objects's orbit takes it from the outer region of the asteroid belt to between the orbit of Saturn (9.5 AU) and Uranus (19.2 AU). The body's short observation arc of less than a month begins with its first observation on 1 June 2013. It has not since been observed.

Physical characteristics 

Johnston's archive assumes an albedo 0.09 and calculates a diameter of 1.8 kilometers.

See also

References

External links 
 

Damocloids

Minor planet object articles (unnumbered)
20130601
Minor planets with a retrograde orbit